João Sávio Melo dos Santos, commonly known as Sávio Santos, is a Brazilian professional footballer who plays as a striker for Syrian Premier League club Al-Karamah.

Club career

Grêmio
Born in Fortaleza, Brazil, Sávio Santos joined the Grêmio's Academy at the age of 15 in 2015.

Career statistics

Club

References

External links

Living people
2000 births
Brazilian footballers
Expatriate footballers in Syria
Association football forwards
Sportspeople from Fortaleza